, also known as Wang Mao, was a politician and diplomat of Ryukyu Kingdom.

Ō Mō was of Ming Chinese ancestry and lived in Kumemura.  His name first appeared in the year 1398.  According to Chūzan Seifu, he went to Ming China to pay tribute in 1398, at that time his official position was "the Chief Clerk of Chūzan".  But according to Rekidai Hōan, we could know that he drafted diplomatic instrument for both Chūzan and Nanzan.  His relationship between these two countries was still not clear.

He was appointed  by King Shō Shishō in 1411.

References

"Ō Mō." Okinawa konpakuto jiten (沖縄コンパクト事典, "Okinawa Compact Encyclopedia").

People of the Ryukyu Kingdom
Ryukyuan people
15th-century Ryukyuan people
Sessei
Ryukyuan people of Chinese descent